Ceferino Bencomo (born 1 November 1970) is a Venezuelan footballer. He played in one match for the Venezuela national football team in 1989. He was also part of Venezuela's squad for the 1991 Copa América tournament.

References

External links
 

1970 births
Living people
Venezuelan footballers
Venezuela international footballers
Association football defenders
Baseball players from Caracas